Chandiya is a 1965 Sri Lankan action movie directed by Titus Thotawatte. In the country, it was the first of its genre to not borrow from Indian cinema.

Plot
Troubled youth encounters the pressures of city life and villainous characters.

Cast
 Gamini Fonseka as Chuttey
 Anula Karunathilaka as Sumana
 H. D. Kulatunga as Kalu Mahathaya
 Christy Leonard Perera as Kavi Kola Karaya
 Karl Gunasena as Karl Vyman
 D. R. Nanayakkara as Piloris
 Robin Fernando
 Sonia Disa
 B. S. Perera
 Anthony C. Perera as Andaya
 Joe Abeywickrama as Peda
 Hugo Fernando as Appuhamy
 Dommie Jayawardena
 Thilakasiri Fernando as Seeya
 Mohideen Baig
 N. R. Dias
 Douglas Wickremasinghe
 Dharmadasa Kuruppu

Songs
 "Manga Hingana Kotath" – Mohideen Baig, Christy Leonard Perera, J. A. Milton Perera and C. T. Fernando
 "Sakala Sirin Piri" – Christy Leonard Perera
 "Mangalam Jaya Mangalam" – Mohideen Baig
 "Unath Dahi Marunath Dahi" – Mohideen Baig, J. A. Milton Perera, Wellu and chorus
 "Atha Gamak" – Latha Walpola

References

External links
 Sri Lanka Cinema Database

1965 films
1960s Sinhala-language films